Datana is a genus of moths of the family Notodontidae. The genus was erected by Francis Walker in 1855.

Species
Datana ministra (Drury, 1773)
Datana angusii Grote & Robinson, 1866
Datana drexelii H. Edwards, 1884
Datana major Grote & Robinson, 1866
Datana contracta Walker, 1855
Datana integerrima Grote & Robinson, 1866
Datana perspicua Grote & Robinson, 1865
Datana robusta Strecker, 1878
Datana modesta Beutenmüller, 1890
Datana ranaeceps (Guérin-Méneville, 1832)
Datana diffidens Dyar, 1917
Datana neomexicana Doll, 1911
Datana chiriquensis Dyar, 1895

References

Notodontidae